The 2021 season is Butwal Lumbini F.C.'s 1st Nepal Super League season.

Season overview

On the Auction of Nepal Super League(NSL), Butwal Lumbini F.C. bought several players including Seshang Angdangbe, Rabin Shrestha, Amir Shrestha, etc.

On 3 April, Butwal Lumbini F.C. announced the signing of three overseas player. The players are Kareen Omoloja, William Opoku, Armad Beadum.

On 20 April, Biraj Maharjan, former captain of Nepal national football team announced that he was joining Butwal Lumbini F.C.

Competition

Nepal Super League

Results

League table

Playoffs

Bracket

Preliminary

Statistics

Goalscorers 
Includes all competitive matches. The list is sorted alphabetically by surname when total goals are equal.

Awards

NSL Fair Play Award

References

External links
Nepal Super League 2021

Nepalese football clubs 2021 season